Magnificat High School is a Catholic all-girls college-preparatory high school located in Rocky River, Ohio, a residential suburb west of Cleveland, Ohio. It was founded in 1955 and is sponsored by the Sisters of the Humility of Mary.

Ohio High School Athletic Association State Championships

 Gymnastics - 1990,1991,1992,1993,1996,1997,1998,1999,2002,2003
 Girls Track and Field - 1993,1994
 Girls Cross Country - 1995, 2008 2009, 2010
 Girls Volleyball - 2021

Notable alumnae 
 Anne Thornton– pastry chef and food writer
 Molly Kearney– comedian, Saturday Night Live cast member

References

External links
 

High schools in Cuyahoga County, Ohio
Catholic secondary schools in Ohio
Girls' schools in Ohio
Educational institutions established in 1955
1955 establishments in Ohio
Roman Catholic Diocese of Cleveland